Alaska Timbers is a semi-professional soccer club based in Anchorage, Alaska. The club's senior team began playing in the Last Frontier Division of the United Premier Soccer League in 2020. The team is an official affiliate of the Portland Timbers of Major League Soccer and the Portland Thorns of the NWSL.

History
An official youth affiliation between the Portland Timbers and the Anchorage Youth Soccer Club was announced in November 2019. AYSC became one of ten affiliate clubs across Oregon, Idaho, and Washington. The agreement was the first of its kind between a professional soccer club and an Alaskan team. On April 30, 2020 it was announced that the club would field a pro-development team in the United Premier Soccer League, the fifth tier of the United States soccer league system, beginning with the 2020 season.

The team played its first league match on June 21, 2020 against Arctic Rush. It earned a 4–1 victory with Timbers player Cole Fox scoring the opening goal of the entire 2020 UPSL season and the first in Alaska Timbers history. The team finished its first season undefeated with a 5–1–0 record and won the Last Frontier Division title.

Current roster

Record
Key

Club management 
As of June 23, 2020

References

External links 
Official Facebook
UPSL profile
Profile at AYSC

Association football clubs established in 2020
Soccer clubs in Alaska
United Premier Soccer League teams
2020 establishments in Alaska
Portland Timbers
Sports in Anchorage, Alaska